The canton of Noyon is an administrative division of the Oise department, northern France. Its borders were modified at the French canton reorganisation which came into effect in March 2015. Its seat is in Noyon.

It consists of the following communes:
 
Appilly
Babœuf
Beaugies-sous-Bois
Beaurains-lès-Noyon
Béhéricourt
Berlancourt
Brétigny
Bussy
Caisnes
Campagne
Carlepont
Catigny
Crisolles
Cuts
Flavy-le-Meldeux
Fréniches
Frétoy-le-Château
Genvry
Golancourt
Grandrû
Guiscard
Larbroye
Libermont
Maucourt
Mondescourt
Morlincourt
Muirancourt
Noyon
Passel
Le Plessis-Patte-d'Oie
Pont-l'Évêque
Pontoise-lès-Noyon
Porquéricourt
Quesmy
Salency
Sempigny
Sermaize
Suzoy
Varesnes
Vauchelles
Ville
Villeselve

References

Cantons of Oise